Joseph Walter Duckworth (July 31, 1921 – February 18, 2007) was an American football end who played in the National Football League for the Washington Redskins.  He played college football at Colgate University.

Born in Orange, New Jersey, Duckworth attended Bloomfield High School and Bordentown Military Institute.

References

1921 births
2007 deaths
American football wide receivers
Bloomfield High School (New Jersey) alumni
Bordentown Military Institute alumni
Colgate Raiders football players
Washington Redskins players
People from Bloomfield, New Jersey
People from Orange, New Jersey
Players of American football from New Jersey
Sportspeople from Essex County, New Jersey